A patronymic, or patronym, is a component of a personal name based on the given name of one's father, grandfather (avonymic), or an earlier male ancestor. 

Patronymics are still in use, including mandatory use, in many countries worldwide, although their use has largely been replaced by or transformed into patronymic surnames. Examples of such transformations include common English surnames such as Johnson (son of John).

Origins of terms
The usual noun and adjective in English is patronymic, but as a noun this exists in free variation alongside patronym. The first part of the word patronym comes from Greek πατήρ patēr "father" (GEN πατρός patros whence the combining form πατρο- patro-); the second part comes from Greek ὄνυμα onyma, a variant form of ὄνομα onoma "name". In the form patronymic, this stands with the addition of the suffix -ικός (-ikos), which was originally used to form adjectives with the sense ‘pertaining to’ (thus 'pertaining to the father's name'). These forms are attested in Hellenistic Greek as πατρώνυμος (patrōnymos) and πατρωνυμικός (patrōnymikos). The form patronym, first attested in English in 1834, was borrowed into English from French patronyme, which had previously borrowed the word directly from Greek. Patronymic, first attested in English in 1612, has a more complex history. Both Greek words had entered Latin, and, from Latin, French. The English form patronymic was borrowed through the mutual influence of French and Latin on English.

History

In many areas around the world, patronyms predate the use of family names. Family names in many Celtic, Germanic, Iberian, Scandinavian, Georgian, Armenian and Slavic languages originate from patronyms, e.g. Wilson (son of William), FitzGerald (son of Gerald), Powell (from "ap Hywel"), Fernández (son of Fernando), Rodríguez (son of Rodrigo), Andersson or Andersen (son of Anders, Scandinavian form of Andrew), Carlsen (son of Carl), Ilyin (of Ilya), Petrov (of Peter), Grigorovich (son of Grigory, Russian form of Gregory), Stefanović (son of Stefan, little Stefan), MacAllister (from "mac Alistair", meaning son of Alistair, anglicized Scottish form of Alexander) and O'Conor (from "Ó Conchobhair", meaning grandson/descendant of Conchobhar). Other cultures which formerly used patronyms have switched to the more widespread style of passing the father's last name to the children (and wife) as their own.
In Iceland, family names are unusual; Icelandic law favours the use of patronyms (and more recently, matronyms) over family names.

Historical and current use

Africa
Traditionally Muslim and non-Arabic speaking African people, such as Hausa and Fulani people, usually (with some exceptions) follow the Arab naming pattern. The word or phrase meaning "son of" is, however, omitted. As such, Mohamed son of Ibrahim son of Ahmed is "Mohamed Ibrahim Ahmed", and Mohamed Ibrahim Ahmed's son Ali is "Ali Mohamed Ibrahim".

Ethiopia and Eritrea

Ethiopians and Eritreans have no concept of family name and surname. If one is to refer to a person, it's with a single name and they will always use the person's given name. Ethiopians and Eritreans use a naming pattern very similar to the Arab naming pattern, but with one exception: no suffix or prefix. The full name of a person is usually two but officially registered with three names. The person's given name comes first, followed by their father's given name and (optionally, for official purposes) their grandfather's name last. For example, a person named Lemlem Mengesha Abraha has Lemlem as her given name, Mengesha (from her father's name) Abraha (grandfather's name). The grandfather's name is usually only added in official documents and not used in everyday life. The father's name is not considered a middle name but a last name, without it being a family name or surname. Women do not take their husband's last name. They continue to go independently by their given name, followed by their father's name, and then their grandfather's name, even after marriage. In both Ethiopia and Eritrea, a person is always addressed by their first name; for example Mrs. Lemlem or Dr. Lemlem.

Kenya
Some Kenyan communities used patronyms. As of 2010, the practice has largely dropped off with the use of just the father's last name as a surname.
Kalenjin use 'arap' meaning 'son of'; 
Kikuyu used 'wa' meaning 'of'. Because of polygamy, matronyms were also used and 'wa' used to identify which wife the child was born of; 
Maasai use 'ole' meaning 'son of'; 
Meru use 'mto' abbreviated M' thus son of Mkindia would be M'Mkindia, pronounced Mto Mkindia.

Mozambique
Patronymic naming is very common in parts of Mozambique.  Although the practice is not universal, patronymic naming has been documented in the Zambezia province.

Nigeria
Now not as prominent as before, many people of southern Nigeria took their father's given name as their last name. It could also be the father's prominent nickname, which takes the place of a first name. An example would be a man named Kolade Fabiyi, who had a son named Dele. The son's name would now be Dele Kolade, not Dele Fabiyi. This is used to distinguish between the extended family who would otherwise have the same last name, for example between cousins. This custom has dropped to the modern English one, because of an increase in British-style education.

Somalia
Somalis use their paternal grandfather's given name as their legal surname for documentation purposes. They also use the term "ina" or "iña" meaning "the son of" or "the daughter of," which is similar to other African and Arab naming patterns. For example, the name "Ahmed Mohamed Ali Farah" means "Ahmed son of Mohamed son of Ali son of Farah." When stating one's lineage, one will say "Ahmed ina Mohamed" (meaning Ahmed, the son of Mohamed). To identify themselves and the sub-clan they belong to, Somalis memorize their long lineage back to a common ancestor. Women never adopt their husband’s patronym but keep their own for life.

South Africa
Among the Zulu, patronymics were used in the pre-colonial era. The prefix "ka" was attached to the father's name, for example Shaka kaSenzangakhona means Shaka son of Senzangakhona. The practice disappeared from everyday use with the introduction of the modern European-style surname system but still remains part of traditional cultural practices, particularly in the case of chieftains and royalty where reciting lineages forms a part of many ceremonial occasions.

East Asia

China
Many indigenous ethnic groups in Yunnan, such as Yi, Hani, Jingpo, Jino, Derung, Nu, Wa, Hmong and Yao, use a son-father patronymic naming system (亲子连名制). Historically, Naxi and Bai have also used the patronymic system. The last one or two syllables of the father's name transfers to become the first one or two syllables of the son's name. The last one or two syllables of the son's name is then used as the first one or two syllables of the grandson's name. The naming tradition is closely tied to Tibeto-Burman traditions.

This system can be seen in the names of Nanzhao, Dali and Lijiang rulers.

Nanzhao kings: Xinuluo (細奴邏)－Luosheng (邏盛)－Shengluopi (盛邏皮)－Piluoge (皮邏閣)－Geluofeng (閣邏鳳)－Fengjiayi (鳳迦異)－Yimouxun (異牟尋)－Xungequan (尋閣勸)－Quanlongsheng (勸龍晟)

Dali kings: Duan Zhixiang (段智祥)－Duan Xiangxing (段祥興)－Duan Xingzhi (段興智)

Regents of Dali Kingdom: Gao Shengtai (高升泰)－Gao Taiming (高泰明)－Gao Mingshun (高明順)－Gao Shunzhen (高順貞)－Gao Zhenshou (高貞壽)－Gao Shouchang (高壽昌)

Lijiang chiefs: A-ts'ung A-liang (阿琮阿良)－A-liang A-hu (阿良阿胡)－A-hu A-lieh (阿胡阿烈)－A-lieh A-chia (阿烈阿甲)－A-chia A-te (阿甲阿得)－A-te A-ch'u (阿得阿初)－A-ch'u A-t'u (阿初阿土)－A-t'u A-ti (阿土阿地)－A-ti A-hsi (阿地阿習)－A-hsi A-ya (阿習阿牙)－A-ya A-ch'iu (阿牙阿秋)－A-ch'iu A-kung (阿秋阿公)－A-kung A-mu (阿公阿目)－A-mu A-tu (阿目阿都)－A-tu A-sheng (阿都阿勝)－A-sheng A-chai (阿勝阿宅)－A-chai A-ssu (阿宅阿寺)－A-ssu A-ch'un (阿寺阿春)－A-ch'un A-su (阿春阿俗)－A-su A-wei (阿俗阿胃)－A-wei A-hui (阿胃阿揮)－A-hui A-chu (阿揮阿住)

Taiwanese Aborigines
Atayal people's given names are followed by the name of their father; both son and daughter use patronymics. 
Amis people's sons’ given names are also followed by their father's name, while daughters’ given names are followed by their mother's name. By contrast, the Seediqs often get to choose which parent’s name goes after their own.

Mongolia
Mongol people's names are preceded by the name of their father and possessive marker; both son and daughter are patronymics.

South Asia

India

A patronymic is common in parts of India. For example, if a father is named Abram Sachin (a masculine name), he might name his son Ismail Abram, who in turn might name his son Patrick Ismail. As a result, unlike surnames, patronymics will not pass down through many generations.

In Tamil Nadu and some parts of Kerala and South Karnataka, patronymy is predominant. This is a significant departure from the rest of the country where caste names are mostly employed as surnames. This came into common use during the 1950s and 1960s when the Dravidian movement campaigned against the use of one's caste as part of the name.

However, rather than using the father's full name, only the first letter – popularly known as the initial – is prefixed to the given name. For example, if a person's given name is Nikhilesh and his father's Rajaraman, then the full name is R. Nikhilesh and is seldom expanded, even in official records. Only where it is forced by stipulation – such as when applying for an Indian passport which does not usually allow initials – is the initial expanded and the name rendered as "Nikhilesh Rajaraman". Some families follow the tradition of retaining the name of the hometown, the grandfather's name, or both as initials. The celebrated Indian English novelist R. K. Narayan's name at birth was Rasipuram Krishnaswami Ayyar Narayanaswami, which was shortened at the behest of his writer friend Graham Greene. Rasipuram is a toponym and Krishnaswami Ayyar is a patronym.

In Tamil Nadu, the use of initials and/or surname is the prerogative of the person, with no strict rules. The late chief minister Karunanidhi preferred to be referred to as M. Karunanidhi where the initial M stood for Muthuvel – his father's given name. M. Karunanidhi's son prefers to be referred to as M. K. Stalin incorporating both his father's and grandfather's names. However M. K. Stalin's son prefers to be referred to as Udhayanidhi Stalin, with Udhayanidhi as his given name and Stalin, his father's given name, as his surname rather than as an initial.

Likewise, cricketer Ravichandran Ashwin, whose father is named Ravichandran, prefers to be referred to as R. Ashwin or Ravichandran Ashwin. This is because commentators in sports often call players by their last names only and it would be incorrect to call him by his father's name, therefore he puts his own given name in the last.

Another upcoming trend is to expand the initials to reflect how they would sound in the native language. For example, Karuppiah prefers to be called Pala. Karuppiah instead of P. Karuppiah and his son Palaniappan prefers Karu. Palaniappan. Cinema director Ranjith prefers Pa. Ranjith instead of P. Ranjith as Pa sounds closer to the name in Tamil rather than P which sounds like Pe unlike the first syllable Pa.

Celebrated scientist M. Annadurai would expand his name as Mayilsami Annadurai; however, he has to be referred to as Annadurai as referring to him as Mayilsami would be referring to him with his father's given name which could be embarrassing for him.

While the usage of caste names as surnames/last names is discouraged (but not banned) in Tamil Nadu, such usage by out-of-state people is greeted with indifference. So, Lakshmi Menon, Shilpa Shetty, etc. are referred by their preferred names which include their caste names. Likewise, old Tamil names with the caste in them are also fully used while referring to them such as Pasumpoan Muthuramalinga Thevar, U.Ve. Swaminatha Iyer etc.

In Andhra Pradesh and Telangana states, the naming pattern is a family name, given name, and caste name, in that order. But sometimes the caste name is omitted. If a name appears like Alugupally Sudhir Reddy, Alugupally is the family name, Sudhir is the given name and Reddy is the caste name. If you find a name like Gorle Sunil Kumar, Gorle is the family name, and Sunil Kumar the given name. Here, the caste name is omitted. Of late, some people are writing their names in the order of given name, caste name, and family name. Sometimes, the caste name is omitted here too. It can be seen in names like Satyanarayana Bandi, where Satyanarayana is the given name, and Bandi the family name.

In Maharashtra, Karnataka, and Gujarat, a very common convention among the Hindu communities is to have the patronymic as the middle name. Examples:

 First Deputy Prime Minister and first Home Minister Sardar Vallabhbhai Patel's full name is Vallabhbhai Jhaverbhai Patel, where Jhaverbhai is his father's given name.
 Cricketer Sachin Tendulkar's full name is Sachin Ramesh Tendulkar, where Ramesh is his father's given name.
 Cricketer Sunil Gavaskar's full name is Sunil Manohar Gavaskar, where Manohar is his father's given name. Sunil Gavaskar's son Rohan Gavaskar would be Rohan Sunil Gavaskar, and so on.
 India's 15th Prime Minister Narendra Modi famously took the oath of office as the Prime Minister of India as Narendra Damodardas Modi, wherein Damodardas is his father's given name. He prefers to write his full name including his father's name as his middle name.

This system works for both boys and girls, except that after marriage, a woman takes her husband's given name as her middle name – her new middle name is no longer a patronymic. East Slavic naming customs are similar, except that the suffix -yevich, -yevna, or something similar is used in a Russian language patronymic.

Indians, particularly Tamils in Singapore, often continue the patronymic tradition; this entails having a single given name, followed by son/daughter of, followed by their father's name.

Malaysian Indians may also follow this custom with "son" or "daughter" of being replaced by "anak lelaki" or "anak perempuan", respectively.

Indians of the Muslim Isma'ili sect also have patronymic middle names that use the father's first name and the grandfather's first name plus a family name. Someone called "Ramazan Rahim Ali Manji" might call his son "Karim Ramazan Rahim Manji" and his granddaughter might be called "Zahra Karim Ramazan Manji".

Southeast Asia
In Malaysia, Singapore and Brunei, ethnic Malays and Indians generally follow the Arabic patronymic naming system of given name + bin/binti or son of/daughter of (often abbreviated SO/DO) + father's name. Non-Muslim indigenous Malaysians in Sabah and Sarawak use the "anak" in place of bin/binti or SO/DO, "anak" being the Malay word for "child".

In Brunei, the ruling family of the monarch uses given name + ibni + father's name instead of using bin/binti.

In Indonesia, there are a number of ethnic groups with different naming systems. The Batak of North Sumatra (Sumatra Utara) give every child the family's name. Sometimes the family's name is prefixed by Huta-, Batu-, etc., but most use Si-, such as Sitanggang, Sihombing, Sibutar-butar, Sinaga, or Sitohang. The family's name is given from the father's family. For example, if the father's name is Boggi Sinaga who married Moetia Siregar then all children will be given the family's name of Sinaga.

In Sunda, a similar cultural rule is used to that of the Batak. The family's name for Sunda is -Wijaya, but this isn't true for all Sundanese families.

West Asia

Armenian 

The use of patronymics was introduced in Armenia by Russians during the times of the Russian Empire and the Soviet Union. Before that period, the use of patronymics was very limited. Patronymics are usually formed by the addition of "i" ("of", pronounced as ee) to the father's name, e.g. if the father's name is "Armen", the corresponding patronymic would be "Armeni" (of Armen). The Russified version of the same patronymic would be "Armenovich" for males and "Armenovna" for females. After Armenia regained its independence from the Soviet Union in 1991 there was a massive decline in the use of Russified patronymics; nowadays few Armenians use patronymics outside of official contexts.

Many Armenian surnames were once patronymics first used by distant ancestors or clan founders. These are characterized by the suffix "-ian" in Western Armenian, often transliterated as "-yan" in Eastern Armenian. These are appended to the given name, i.e. Kardashian, Asdvadzadourian, Tankian, Hagopian, Khachadourian, Mardirosian, Bedrosian, Sarkissian, etc. Note that the suffix "-ian" was also appended to trades, as in Adakhtsakordzian (issued from the carpenter), Chalian (issued from the candlemaker), Darbinian (issued from the smith).

Though not as common nowadays, it was customary for a long time for these children (particularly the sons) to change their last names to the name-in-religion of their father. For example, the son of Ter (Reverend) Bartev would change his last name to Ter Bartevian.

Azerbaijani 

In Azeri, patronymics are formed through -oğlu (sometimes transliterated as ogly) for males and qızı (often transliterated as gizi or kizi) for females. Before the late 19th–early 20th century, patronymics were used as an essential part of a person's full name, i.e. Sardar Ilyas oğlu ("Sardar, son of Ilyas") and Mina Nabi qızı ("Mina, daughter of Nabi"), since surnames were mostly non-existent before Sovietization (with the exception of the upper and some middle-class families). After surnames were commonly adopted in Azerbaijan in the 1920s, patronymics still remained parts of full names, i.e. Sardar Ilyas oğlu Aliyev ("Sardar Aliyev, son of Ilyas"). Nowadays in Azerbaijan, patronymics sometimes replace surnames in unofficial use. Normally in such case, they are spelled as one word (i.e. Eldar Mammadoğlu, Sabina Yusifqızı). Many Azeri surnames are also derived from Persian-style patronymics ending in -zadeh (Kazimzadeh, Mehdizadeh, etc.). They are found among both Caucasian and Iranian Azeris. However, unlike the former, Azeris in Iran do not generally use patronymics in oglu / qizi. Azeri patronymics are not to be confused with Turkish surnames in -oğlu and Greek surnames in -ογλού (-oglou), which do not have specific female versions and do not reflect names of fathers.

Semitic cultures
A common feature of historical Semitic names is use of a patronymic system. Since ancient times, men and women have been named using this system. This was not limited to any certain region or religion. It was only in the 17th and 18th centuries when laws were put in place in European nations demanded that those of Semitic descent abandoned the patronymic naming scheme in favor of consistent legal surnames. It was only after these laws were ratified that most of the Jews and Muslims in these nations received surnames.

Arabic 

In addition,  means "daughter of". Thus, for example,  means "Ali son of ʿAmr". However, the pronunciation  is dialectal and has nothing to do with either the spelling or pronunciation in Classical Arabic.
See for example .

In medieval times, an illegitimate child of unknown parentage would sometimes be termed , "son of his father" (notably Ziyad ibn Abihi.) In the Qur'an, Jesus (Isa in Arabic) is consistently termed  – a matronymic (in the Qur'an, Jesus has no father; see Islamic view of Jesus).

Patronymics are still standard in parts of the Arab world, notably Saudi Arabia and Iraq. However, some of the Arab world has switched to a family name system. As in English, the new family names are sometimes based on what was formerly a patronymic. The form most used in the Arab world is the usage of both the patronymic and a family name, often using both the father's and paternal grandfathers given name in sequence after the own given name, and then the family name. In Iraq for example, full names are formed by combining the given name of an individual with the given name of their father (sometimes the father is skipped and the paternal grandfather's given name is used instead, sometimes both father and paternal grandfather are used), along with the town, village, or clan name. For instance, Hayder Muhammed al-Tikriti is the son of Muhammed named Hayder, and he is from the town of Tikrit. In Saudi Arabia, naming conventions are similar to Iraq's but family names are used much more often.

Aramaic 
In Aramaic, the prefix bar- means "son" and is used as a prefix meaning "son of". In the Bible, Peter is called Bar-Jonah in Matthew 16:17 and Nathanael is possibly called Bartholomew because he is the son of Tolmai (or son of Ptolemy, with "P" being reduced). The titles can also be figurative, for example in Acts 4:36–37 a man named Joseph is called Barnabas meaning "son of consolation". The feminine equivalent, b'rat-, is found in the Talmud and Targumim,

Mandaean names also often make use of the prefix bar-.

Hebrew 

In the Hebrew patronymic system, commonly used by Jews, the first name is followed by either ben- or bat- ("son of" and "daughter of", respectively), and then the father's name, mother's name, or both.

Assyrian 
The Assyrians for centuries have used the patronymic bet or bit literally meaning "house" in Assyrian Neo-Aramaic; however, in the context of the name it means "from the house of [the father's name]."

Persian 
In Persian, patronymics  are formed by names ending with the suffix "-pur"  for men and "-dokht"  for women. For example: Shahpur (son of king) and Sinapur (son of Sina). Depending on country, some suffixes are more common than others. For example, in Iran, the suffix "-pur" is common while in Afghanistan, the suffix "-Zadah"  or "-Zad"  is common, although --Zadeh is common in Iran.

Turkish

In Turkish, the suffixes used to indicate paternal ancestry are -oğlu and -zade, which indicate the ancestry as coming from a certain man. Like many other patronymics in other languages, with the formalization of naming conventions by laws in the late modern contemporary age many turned into surnames. After the 'Surname revolution' in 1934, many people chose professions or habitat as surnames with or without the suffix -oğlu, such as Elbeyioğlu, Bakkaloğlu or Giritlioğlu and with -zade such as Beyzade, Mehmedzade, Yusufzade.

Europe
In Europe, patronyms were formerly widespread but later became confined to Scandinavia, Iceland, and some Eastern Slavic cultures.

English
In England, names ending with the suffix "-son" or "-ing" were often originally patronymic. In addition, the archaic French (more specifically, Norman) prefix fitz (cognate with the modern French fils, meaning "son") appears in England's aristocratic family lines dating from the Norman Conquest, and also among the Anglo-Irish. Thus there are names such as Fitzgerald and Fitzhugh. Of particular interest is the name "Fitzroy", meaning "son of [the] king", which was sometimes used by illegitimate royal children.

Irish, Scottish, and Manx

The use of "Mac" in some form was prevalent in Scottish Gaelic, Irish, and Manx, in all of which it denotes "son." "Mc" is also a frequent anglicisation in both Scotland and Ireland. In Ireland, the forms "Mag" and "M'" are encountered. The prefix "Mac" is used to form a patronym, such as "Mac Coinnich"—or the anglicized "Mackenzie"—son of Coinneach/Kenneth. The female equivalent of Mac is Nic, condensed from nighean mhic (in Scottish Gaelic) or iníon mhic (in Irish), both meaning daughter. For example, the Scottish Gaelic surname, Nic Dhòmhnaill meaning "daughter of a son of Dòmhnall" (in English, Donald), as in Mairi Nic Dhòmhnaill, or Mary MacDonald.

At the north end of the Irish Sea, in Ulster, the Isle of Man, and Galloway (indeed as far north as Argyll), "Mac" was frequently truncated in speech to /k/. This led to such anglicisations as "Qualtrough" (Son of Walter) and "Quayle" (son of Paul, cf. MacPhail), usually beginning with "C," "K," or "Q." In Ireland, this truncation resulted in surnames such as "Guinness" (son of Aonghus, cf. MacAonghusa), beginning usually in "C" or "G" for patronymics prefixed with Mac, and in "H" (e.g., "Hurley" [descendant of Iarlath, cf. Ua h-Iarfhlatha/O'Hurley]) for surnames prefixed with "O." Colloquial Scottish Gaelic also has other patronymics of a slightly different form for individuals, still in use (for more information please see: Scottish Gaelic personal naming system).

Welsh and Cornish

Before the 1536 Act of Union, the Welsh did not generally employ surnames, but instead used epithets (e.g. Selyf Sarffgadau, "Selyf the Battle-Serpent"), patronyms (e.g. Rhodri ap Merfyn, "Rhodri son of Merfyn"), and (much less often) matronyms (e.g. Rhodri map Nest, "Rhodri son of Nest") to identify people.

Welsh, as a P-Celtic language, originally used map or mab instead of the Q-Celtic mac employed in Ireland and Scotland. These were later simplified to the modern Welsh ap and ab. A common practice is to use mab/ab before a father's name beginning with a vowel (e.g., Llywelyn mab Iorwerth), but the two alternative forms are also employed arbitrarily in many sources.

Daughters were indicated by ferch or verch (mutated from merch, "girl, daughter"). Angharad verch Owain would be "Angharad, daughter of Owain".

After the Acts of Union, this led to many Welsh surnames being variants of their father or ancestor's personal name: ap or ab Ieuan often became "Evans"; ap Rhys, "Price"; ap or ab Owain, "Bowen"; ap Hywel, "Powell" or "Howell". In addition to these Anglicised baptismal and official names, patronyms continued to be commonly employed in Welsh until the Industrial Revolution, particularly in the north and west of Wales. Patronyms were sometimes employed within the English names as well by using the father's personal name as the sons' middle name.

Perhaps because Cornwall was legally incorporated into England earlier than Wales was, patronyms (e.g.) are less common there than toponyms (e.g. Tresillian, Trevithick, Nanskeval/Nankeville) and occupational surnames (e.g. An Gof, [An] Gove, (Blacksmith); Helyer (Cornish dialect – possibly a slater or huntsman).

Dutch
In Dutch, patronymics were often used in place of family names or as middle names. Patronymics were composed of the father's name plus an ending -zoon for sons, -dochter for daughters. For instance, Abel Janszoon Tasman is "Abel son of Jan Tasman", and Kenau Simonsdochter Hasselaer: "Kenau, daughter of Simon Hasselaer". In written form, these endings were often abbreviated as -sz. and -dr. respectively e.g. Jeroen Cornelisz. "Jeroen son of Cornelis", or Dirck Jacobsz. The endings -s, -se and -sen were also commonly used for sons and often for daughters too. In the northern provinces, -s, as genitive case, was almost universally used for both sons and daughters. The suffix -x as in "Tacx" or "Hendrix" also denoted the son or daughter of... and is now integrated as a complete name.

Patronymics were common in the Dutch United Provinces until the French invasion in 1795 and subsequent annexation in 1810. As the Netherlands were now a province of France, a registry of births, deaths and marriages was established in 1811, whereupon emperor Napoleon forced the Dutch to register and adopt a distinct surname.

French

In France, the terms patronyme and nom patronymique had long been used interchangeably to designate the family name, meaning that it is inherited from the father.

The tradition of patronymic lineage is still used among some Canadian descendants of French colonists: in the oral tradition of many Acadians, for example, Marc à Pierre à Gérard (lit. "Marc of Pierre of Gérard"), means "Marc, son of Pierre, grandson of Gérard".

Italian

The Italian language used to designate patronymics in formal writing up to 1975 using the preposition di (English of) for a living father and fu (English late) for a deceased one. That is, Mario di Giovanni Rossi meant that Mario Rossi is the son of a living man named Giovanni; Francesco fu Pietro Verdi meant that Francesco Verdi is the son of a deceased man named Pietro. When the father's name was unknown, institutions could use the formula N.N. (Nomen nescio, Latin for "I don't know the name") or use the mother's name or omit this part entirely.

In parish records written in Latin, the father's name would be written in genitive with no preposition. For a deceased father, the particle quondam (English once/formerly) was added. The examples above would have been translated as Marius Johannis Rossi and Franciscus quondam Petri Verdi.

Patronymics are not in common usage in modern Italian. However, some of them have been the source of various surnames. As an example, the individuals descended from a man named Paolo could have gained the patronymic surnames Paolo, Di Paolo, De Paoli, Paoli, Polo, Pagolo, Pagoli, Paolino, Lino, etc.

Iberian languages

In the past, both in Spanish and Portuguese, the endings -ez and -es tended to be conflated since pronunciation was quite similar in the two languages. Today, Portuguese has been fully standardized to -es; Spanish is also standardized to -ez, but it is very common to see archaic endings in -es. For instance, Pires/Peres and Pérez are the modern equivalents of English "Peterson" in Portuguese and Spanish.

In Portugal, there are some surnames that had a patronymic genesis but, while still common, no longer indicate patronymic usage. For instance, Álvares was the son of Álvaro and Gonçalves was the son of Gonçalo (it was the case of Nuno Álvares Pereira, son of Álvaro and Gonçalves Pereira, son of Gonçalo Pereira). Other cases include Rodrigues (son of Rodrigo), Nunes (son of Nuno) and Fernandes (son of Fernando).
In the same way, the surname Soares means son of Soeiro (in Latin Suarius). It comes from Latin Suaricius (son of Suarius); the Latin genitive suffix -icius/a was used to indicate a patronymic. Later it became Suáriz, Suárez (both Spanish), and eventually Soares (Portuguese). Another theory attributes the Iberian -ez style patronymics to Germanic (Visigothic) rather than Latin influence.

Spanish patronyms follow a similar pattern to the Portuguese (e.g., López: son of Lope; Fernández: son of Fernando; Martínez: son of Martín; Rodríguez: son of Rodrigo; Álvarez: son of Álvaro). Common endings include -ez, -az, -iz, -is and -oz. However, not all surnames with similar endings are necessarily patronymic. For example, Chávez is not the son of Chavo, but comes from Galician or Portuguese chaves, meaning "keys", with the "s" denoting the plural form of chave, as is the case of key/keys in English.

However, these kinds of surnames were unusual outside the Crown of Castile. Apart from natural spelling variations (such as using Giménez or Ximénez), modern orthographic standardisation in each Iberian dialect brought a number of crossed versions. It is possible to find the Catalan language politician Jordi Sànchez (whose surname, while Spanish, has a grave accent – characteristic of Catalan – instead of the acute accent used in Spanish) or the journalist Vicenç Sanchis (who spells his surname in a way that is closer to Catalan, but with the ch digraph characteristic of Spanish).

Due to the letters, z and s being pronounced alike in Latin American dialects of Spanish, many non-patronymic surnames with an -es have come to be written with an -ez. In Hispano-American Spanish, the -ez spellings of Chávez (Hugo Chávez), Cortez (Alberto Cortez) and Valdez (Nelson Valdez) are not patronymic surnames, but simply variant spellings of the Iberian Spanish spelling with -es, as in the names of Manuel Chaves, Hernán Cortés and Víctor Valdés. For more on the -z surnames in Spanish see Influences on the Spanish language.

A list of some Iberian patronymics:

Archaic given name, not in use.
Archaic given name, not in use. Equivalent to the German Gunther.
Ruy or Rui is an archaic hypocoristic form of Rodrigo.

Norse languages

In Norse custom, patronyms and matronyms were formed by using the ending -son (later -søn and -sen in Danish, Norwegian and German) to the genitive form of the father's name to indicate "son of", and -dóttir (Icelandic and Faroese -dóttir, Swedish and Norwegian -dotter, Danish and Norwegian -datter) for "daughter of". The resulting patronymic was generally not used as a surname; however, a third name, a so-called byname based on location or personal characteristic, was often added to differentiate people and could eventually develop into a kind of family name. Some Early Modern examples of the latter practice, where the patronymic was placed after the given name and was followed by the surname, are Norwegian Peder Claussøn Friis, the son of Nicolas Thorolfsen Friis (Claus in Claussøn being short for Nicolas) and Danish Thomas Hansen Kingo, the son of Hans Thomsen Kingo.

Eventually, most Nordic countries replaced or complemented this system with the prevailing "international" standard of inherited family names. In Norway, for example, the parliament passed a family name act in 1923, citing the rising population and the need to avoid the confusion of new last names in every generation. The law does allow a person to retain a patronymic as a middle name in addition to the surname, as was common in Early Modern times; this is not a common practice but does occur, a modern example being Audhild Gregoriusdotter Rotevatn. The Danish government outlawed the practice in 1856 and eased the regulations in 1904 to deal with the limited number of patronymics. In Sweden the practice of children keeping their fathers and wives taking their husband's patronymic as a surname occurred in the 18th century but was first prevalent in the late 19th century. Patronymics were normal in Sweden, at least in rural Sweden, until the 19th century. From the end of the 19th-century patronymics gradually became less common in Sweden until they were abolished in 1966. In 1982 the right to use patronyms (and matronyms) was partially restored; a person (or the parents of a child) had to apply and pay a fee. 1 July 2017 parents in Sweden are free to give their children patronyms/matronyms at birth instead of inherited family names, and any person can change her or his last name to a matronymic or patronymic.

Matronyms were used exceptionally if the child was born out of wedlock or if the mother was much more high-born or well known than the father, a historical example being Sweyn Estridsson.

In Iceland, patronymics or matronymics are still used as last names and this is in fact compulsory by law, with a handful of exceptions. The father's name (usually in the genitive case) plus the word son for sons, dóttir for daughters. For example, Jóhanna Sigurðardóttir (i.e. "Jóhanna, daughter of Sigurð[ur]"). People, who do not identify as male or female (nonbinary people) can also use the suffix -bur, which means child of''''.

In 2022, a citizen of the island of Gotland asked to use her surname with the Gutnish ending -dotri (instead of Swedish -dotter). The authority appealed against the positive decision of the administrative court in Stockholm, but in the end, the Court of Appeal ruled that she was allowed to use a Gutnish surname.

Finnish
In Finland, the use of patronymics was a result of relatively-recent Swedish influence and remained uncommon outside official documents. It was only in the 19th century that the use of patronymics gained any sort of popularity among the Finnish-speaking lower classes. Family names became obligatory in Finland by law in 1920.

Historically, patronymics were composed in Swedish fashion: the father's name and the suffix -n’' for genitive plus the word poika for sons, tytär for daughters. For example, Tuomas Abrahaminpoika means "Tuomas, Abraham's son", and Martta Heikintytär means "Martta, Heikki's daughter".

Bulgarian
In Bulgarian, the patronymics are -ov/-ev and -ova/-eva for men and women, respectively. They are identical to the endings of family names in Bulgarian and some other Slavic family names, such as those in Russian and Czech. In Bulgarian official documents, the patronymic comes before the surname, so Ivan Marinov Yordanov would be Ivan, son of Marin Yordanov.

Georgian

In Georgian, patronymics, when used, add s to the end of the father's name, followed by dze for a man and asuli for a woman. For example, Joseph Stalin's original name was Ioseb Besarionis Dze Jugashvili. After the end of the Soviet Union, patronymics in Georgia have become disused as a Russian tradition.

Georgian family names derive mostly from patronymics, nicknames and places of origin. Two common elements, dze and shvili mean "son of" and "child" respectively.

Greek

Most Greek surnames are patronymics by origin albeit in various forms depending on the ancestral locality. Diminutive suffixes that denote "son of" or, more generally, "descendant of" start with the given name such as Δημήτριος Dēmétrios and then have the patronymic surname such as Dēmētrópoulos (Peloponnese), Dēmētrákos (Laconia), Dēmētréas (Messenian Mani), Dēmētrátos (Cephalonia), Dēmētrákēs (Crete), Dēmētriádēs/Dēmētr-ídēs (Pontus, Asia Minor), Dēmētréllēs (Lesbos), Dēmétroglou (Asia Minor) (identical to Turkish patronym -oğlu), or simply Dēmētríou (especially common in Cyprus, with the first name in the genitive) are formed. The same principle can apply to surnames deriving from professions. For example, as from παπάς, papás "priest", are derived the surnames Papadópoulos, Papadákos, Papadéas, Papadátos, Papadákēs, Papadéllēs, Papazoglou etc., all of which signify a "priest's son". The same  may apply in combination: Papanikoláou, Papanikolópoulos, "the son of the priest Nikolaos". A daughter's family name is the same as the son's but is always declined in the genitive: Dēmētropoúlou, Papanikoláou.

In addition to those surnames, actual patronymics are used in official documents as "middle names" preceding the surname. For example, the children of a Ioánnis Papadópoulos can be María Ioánnou Papadopoúlou and Andréas Ioánnou Papadópoulos (Ioánnou is the genitive of Ioánnis). Traditionally, a married woman would adopt her husband's family name. Now, however, women in Greece can keep their own surnames if they choose.

Hungarian

In Hungarian, patronyms were traditionally formed with the ending -fi (sometimes spelled as -fy or -ffy). That system is no longer in common use, but traces can still be found in some frequent current surnames such as Pálfi (son of Paul), Győrfi, Bánfi or Sándor Petőfi (a famous poet who chose the Hungarian form instead of his Slavic birth name, Petrovics). In the Old Hungarian period (10th–16th century, see History of Hungarian), surnames were not in common use, and the full genitive was represented as in Péter fia András (Peter's son Andrew). Such forms are in frequent use in charters and legal documents from that time. In Hungarian, the surname precedes the given name.

Romanian

In Romanian, the endings -escu and -eanu were used, as in Petrescu, 'son of Petre (Peter)'; many modern Romanian family names were formed from such patronymics. Less commonly, matronymics formed with the genitive form (using the prefix a-) were used, as in Amariei, '(son/daughter) of Maria'.

Russian

In Russian the endings  and -ich are used to form patronymics for men. It would be cognate to the Latin genitive -ici, used for marking the family line, and also as equivalent to 'little' -Vladic= 'the little Vlad'-. For example, in Russian, a man named Ivan with a father named Nikolay would be known as Ivan Nikolayevich or "Ivan, son of Nikolay" (Nikolayevich being a patronymic). Likewise, a woman named Lyudmila with a father named Nikolay would be known as Lyudmila Nikolayevna or "Lyudmila, daughter of Nikolay" (Nikolayevna being a patronymic). Examples in titles of classical Russian literature include The Tales of the Late Ivan Petrovich Belkin, The Death of Ivan Ilyich and "The Tale of How Ivan Ivanovich Quarreled with Ivan Nikiforovich".

In Russia, the patronymic is an official part of the name, used in all official documents, and when addressing somebody both formally and among friends. The correct written order of a full name is surname, given name, then patronymic – this order would be found on official documents, business cards, and formal addresses. For example, a woman named Mariya Iosifovna Zhukova would hand you a business card that says Zhukova Mariya Iosifovna. Use of the given name followed by the patronymic in Russian is always the neutral, correct and polite way to address any person except close friends, family members, or children – in such cases usage of the patronymic adds humor intonation. This form would be congruent to the Western use of Mr. and the surname for the polite and proper use and reference. Instead of schoolchildren calling their teacher Ms. and surname, the proper form would be given name and patronymic. For example, a teacher named Anna Borisovna Kopylova would always be called Anna Borisovna by her pupils. When addressing a much younger person, only the first name is commonly used. Individuals are addressed by their given name followed by the patronymic (e.g., "Mikhail Nikolayevich") in many situations including on formal occasions, by colleagues at work, by acquaintances, or when being addressed by someone younger in age. It is becoming more common for younger individuals (under 50) to drop the patronymic at work. In informal situations, if a person is called by a diminutive (such as Misha for Mikhail or Nastya for Anastasia), the patronymic is not used.

In colloquial, informal speech, it is also possible to contract the ending of a patronymic: thus Nikolayevich becomes Nikolaich, and Stepan Ivanovich becomes Stepan Ivanych or simply Ivanych as the given name may be omitted altogether. In this case, the contraction, if possible, is obligatory: Ivan Sergeyevich Sidorov may be called "Sergeich" or, more rarely, "Sergeyevich". In contrast to male names, if a woman is called by her patronymic name without a given name, the patronymic is usually not contracted: "Ivanovna" but "Mar' Ivanna"; "Sergeyevna"/"Sergevna" is one exception, where both forms are fine. Typically, a patronymic name alone is a familiar form of addressing an older female.

Serbian

Vuk Karadžić reported in the 19th century that Serbs sometimes used their old family names, and sometimes patronymics. Vuk Karadžić himself used patronymic Stefanović (son of Steven), and sometimes Karadzić, old family name. However, nowadays, the patronymic names in Serbia are mostly used on legal documents, and have the form of the father's name that says the child is 'of so and so'... example: Marija Dragoljuba Pavlović, where Dragoljub is the father's name and 'Dragoljuba' literally means 'of Dragoljub'.   There are also other forms, like to include - the father's name - in brackets: Maria (Dragoljub) Pavlović.

It became more common to include the name of any one of the parents in legal documents ('ime jednog roditelja') - in practice this is usually still the father's name 

In Serbia, Croatia and Bosnia, the patronymic names do not change form between masculine and feminine.  Example: Marija Dragoljuba Pavlović (Dragoljub is the father's name; Dragoljuba is the form that says she is his daughter or literally 'of Dragoljub').

Ukrainian

In Ukrainian, the female patronymic always ends with -івна (-ivna) or -ївна (-yivna). The male patronymic always ends with -ович (-ovych) or -йович (-yovych). Exception: Illia (Ілля) → Illich (Ілліч) (e.g. Illia Illich Mechnikov), Sava (Сава) → Savych (Савич), Yakiv (Яків) → Yakovych (Якович).

Patronyms are part of the full name and are obligatory in formal messages. They are frequent in common speech, such as to call a person in a respectful manner (by using the name, followed by the patronym) and to accent an informal message in formal environments, as between colleagues with good relationships at work (by using the patronym with neither the name nor the family name).

See also
 Filiation
 Matronymic
 Toponymic surname

Notes

References

External links

 
 
 17th Century Dutch Surnames
 Data Wales Surnames (archived 27 March 2009)
 What's the story with Dutch surnames? 

Surname

Types of words